Franz Wernekinck (19 February 1764 in Burg Vischering, now part of Lüdinghausen – 6 February 1839 in Münster) was a German physician and botanist. He was the father of anatomist Friedrich Christian Gregor Wernekinck (1798–1835).

From 1788 he worked as a physician in Münster. From 1797 to 1822 he was a professor of natural history at the University of Münster, where he also served as director of its botanical garden. In 1802 he attained the title of Medicinalrath.

Associated written works 
 Icones plantarum sponte nascentium in episcopatu Monasteriensi, 1798.
 Franz Wernekinck, Arzt und Botaniker (1764 - 1839) und seine Pflanzenbilder aus dem Münsterland; by Kaja, Hans: Verlag: Münster: Aschendorff, 1995, (biography of Franz Wernekinck).

References 

1764 births
1839 deaths
People from Lüdinghausen
18th-century German botanists
Academic staff of the University of Münster
19th-century German botanists